Mathieu Roy may refer to:

Mathieu Roy (ice hockey, born 1983), Canadian ice hockey defenceman
Mathieu Roy (ice hockey, born 1986), Canadian ice hockey winger